"Nyebe" (is a song by Filipino boy band SB19, released on December 12, 2022. John Paulo Nase wrote the song and produced it with Thyro Alfaro. It is a ballad-produced song with reflective and emotional lyrics, and it is about feeling of hopelessness: talking about challenging life, to live with it and pray, there is always a ray of hope. It was showing a more reflective and emotional side of the group.

Pablo is the music video creative director for "Nyebe". It premiered on YouTube on December 12, 2022. The music video visualizer is an emotional series of images and photo-highlight of SB19's journey during its 2022 Where You At World Tour where they discuss substantial questions about happiness, worries and living in the moment. It was inspired by the calming and relatability vibe of inspirational gospel songs.

Background and composition 
John Paulo Nase wrote "Nyebe" and co-produced it with singer-songwriter and producer, Thyro Alfaro. Thyro Alfaro mixed the song with Heo Chan-goo by Knob Sound Korea and also did the mastering. "Nyebe" is five minutes and forty-seven seconds long. Media outlets described "Nyebe" as a heartfelt-ballad-produced, with contemporary inspirational-gospel-infused, and soulful ballad song similar to "Mapa", "Tilaluha" and "Hanggang Sa Huli". "Nyebe" also features the SB19's more reflective and emotional side, inspirational-soulful vibe of the group.
 
"Nyebe" contemplate the inspirational and touching side of the group. As Pablo stated in the interview with Philstar Global:

Release and promotion 
Before the official release of the new single, "Nyebe" was already part of the Where You At Global Tour set list. It was sung by SB19 on its live performances  for the entire leg.

On December 9, days after the announcement of "Manila WYAT Homecoming Concert", SB19 has dropped a hint by changing the logo and banner of its official social media accounts. On the following day, December 10, they started posting series of video teaser on their social media about the new song with inspirational messages and questions. Two days later, the song "Nyebe" was released to the public. Also on December 12, the group released the music video for their new single "Nyebe".

Music video 
The music video visualizer has the creative direction of the band's leader Pablo, which was released on the same release date as the official audio on December 12, 2022. The visualizer documents behind-the-scenes moments from SB19's travels through their recent Where You At World Tour that visited New York, Los Angeles, San Francisco, Dubai and Singapore. Filmed in black-and-white, viewers see moments of the boys hanging around a fire pit and their visit to the Sony Music headquarters in NY, but also less upbeat visuals like what appears to be an unhoused person's cardboard shelter or trash on the sidewalk. It is also a collaborative effort from the people behind the global tour. "Nyebe" is an inspirational-heartfelt relatable song that gave hope, reminding everyone that there is always light behind the darkest cloud.

Credits and personnel 
Credits are adapted from Tidal and the song's music video.
 SB19 – main vocals
 John Paulo Nase – writer, producer
 Thyro Alfaro – producer and mixing
 Heo Chan-goo @Knob Sound Korea – audio mixing and mastering
 John Paulo Nase - creative director

References 

SB19 songs
2022 songs
2022 singles
2020s ballads
Tagalog-language songs
Sony Music singles